Sharon Jones (1956–2016) was an American soul/funk singer.

Sharon Jones may also refer to:
Sharon Jones (figure skater) (born 1964), British ice dancer
Sharon Wichman (1952) (also known as Sharon Jones), American swimmer